The  (in English, the House of the Goddess Mita) was a house located in Arecibo barrio-pueblo in Arecibo, Puerto Rico. The house itself is unique because of its Beaux-Arts architectural design, and was listed on the National Register of Historic Places on September 9, 1988. 

The NRHP registration form states that in the future the NRHP record should be updated to reflect its significance because of who lived there. A self-professed goddess lived there. When she was living in this house in 1940, Juanita "Mita" García Peraza declared herself to be God and began the Mita Congregation, which continues to this day with its headquarters in Puerto Rico and chapters in the United States, Canada, Venezuela, Colombia, Ecuador, Panama, Costa Rica, Mexico, El Salvador, Spain and the Dominican Republic.  

By 2017 the house was in ruins and what remains is a shell of the structure.

References

External links
 

		
National Register of Historic Places in Arecibo, Puerto Rico
Beaux-Arts architecture in Puerto Rico
Houses completed in 1914
Mita
1914 establishments in Puerto Rico
Unused buildings in Puerto Rico
Ruined houses
Protestantism in Puerto Rico
History of Christianity in North America